See Austin 10 for the Cambridge models of 1937 to 1947.
See Austin A40 for other A40 models.

The Austin Cambridge (sold as A40, A50, A55, and A60) is a medium-sized motor car range produced by the Austin Motor Company, in several generations, from September 1954 through to 1971 as cars and to 1973 as light commercials. It replaced the A40 Somerset and was entirely new, with modern unibody construction. The range had two basic body styles with the A40, A50, and early A55 using a traditional rounded shape and later A55 Mark IIs and A60s using Pininfarina styling.

The A40 number was re-used on a smaller car (the Austin A40 Farina) from 1958 to 1968, and the Cambridge name had previously been used to designate one of the available body styles on the pre-war 10 hp range.

The Austin Cambridge was initially offered only with a four-passenger, four-door saloon body, although a few pre-production two-door models were also made. It had a modern body design with integrated wings and a full-width grille. Independent suspension was provided at the front by coil springs and wishbones while a live axle with anti-roll bar was retained at the rear.

A van derivative introduced in November 1956 and a coupé utility (pick up) introduced in May 1957 and remained available until 1974, some three years after the demise of the cars on which they had been based.

A40 Cambridge

A 1.2-litre straight-four pushrod engine B-Series engine based on the one used in the previous Austin Somerset (although sharing no parts) powered the new Austin Cambridge.

The A40 Cambridge was intended to be available in both two-door saloon and four-door saloon variants; however, the two-door body style did not reach production.

Only 30,666 A40 Cambridge models were produced. After the A40 Cambridge was dropped early in 1957, the A40 name was re-used on the smaller A40 Farina, though that car, the 'Countryman' version of which was an early example of a hatchback, was neither a replacement nor much related to the A40 Cambridge.

A50 Cambridge

Also introduced in September 1954, and with a body identical to that of the A40 Cambridge, was the A50 Cambridge which used a new 1.5-litre (1,489 cc) B-Series four-cylinder engine with single Zenith carburettor which was good for 50 hp (37 kW).  It sold better and remained in production through to 1957 with 114,867 A50s being produced

The deluxe version had a heater, leather seat facings, carpets replacing the standard rubber matting, armrests on the doors, twin-tone horns, a passenger sun visor, and some extra chrome, including overriders.

Technical advances in the A50 Cambridge included an optional Borg-Warner overdrive unit for the top three (of four) gears.  A semi-automatic transmission (branded "manumatic" and providing pedal-free clutch operation) was also offered, but it was unpopular with buyers.

A number of modifications were introduced in October 1956, including smaller  wheels and an increased compression ratio (8.3:1).

The test car cost £720 including taxes.

A radio and a clock were optional extras.

As with its predecessor the A40 Somerset, the A50 Cambridge was built under licence by Nissan in Japan; the arrangement ended in 1959. In total, 20,855 licensed Austin vehicles were produced by Nissan in Japan.

A55 Cambridge

In January 1957, the A55 Cambridge was introduced to replace the A50 model.  It used the same 1.5-litre B-Series engine as its predecessor, though with a higher compression ratio. It was rated at 51 hp (38 kW) at 4,250 rpm.

The Cambridge had been restyled somewhat and now had a larger boot and much larger rear window. The car was also lowered by fitting   road wheels which were smaller than those on the A50 but the overall gearing remained the same by changing the rear axle ratio. Two-tone paint was an option.

Some 154,000 were produced before it was replaced by a new Pininfarina-designed A55 Cambridge for 1959.

The test car cost £870 including taxes of £291.

Half-ton commercials
Half-ton commercial models based on the A55 were introduced in 1957. The van was released in February and was followed in May by pick-up, chassis and cab and chassis and scuttle models. Contemporary sales literature used the term "Austin ½ ton van and pick-up".

In October 1962, new models were introduced with a restyled front end and bumper, chrome side mouldings, 14" wheels, and various interior refinements. Morris-badged van and pick-up models also were now offered. From September 1963, the commercial models were fitted with the  engine from the Austin A60 saloon, with the Austins still marketed under the "Austin ½ ton" name. They remained in production to 1973.

Australian production
The A55 Cambridge saloon was assembled by BMC Australia and a coupe utility version was designed and assembled by the Sydney-based Pressed Metal Corporation, a subsidiary of Larke, Neave and Carter, Austin Distributors.

A55 Cambridge Mark II

The A55 Cambridge Mark II, known as the first "Farina" model because of its Pininfarina design, was produced from 1959 through to 1961.  It was a rebadged Morris Oxford and retained the 1.5 litre B-Series engine, now with an SU carburettor, and producing  at 4,350 rpm.

The interior had individual leather trimmed seats in front spaced closely together to allow a central passenger to be carried. The gear change was either on the column or floor-mounted and the handbrake lever between the driver's seat and the door. Other improvements highlighted at the time included an enlarged luggage compartment with counterbalanced lid and increased elbow width on both front and rear seats. A heater could be fitted as an option.

A "Countryman" estate model appeared in 1960. The Austin Cambridge estates was called the "Countryman". (Morris Oxford Estates were called "Travellers".) A55 Mark II and A60 estates were identical from the windscreen back; the later models never got the reduced rear fins and modified rear lights of the A60 saloons.

The engineering of the car was conventional with coil sprung independent front suspension and a live axle at the rear with semi elliptic leaf springs. The braking used a Girling system with  drums all round.

A total of 149,994 were built.

The test car cost £878 including taxes of £293.

Australian production

The A55 Mk II entered production in Australia in 1959 with a 1,622 cc version of the B Series four-cylinder engine as the Austin A60. Australian use of the larger engine and the A60 name preceded British usage by two years. The A60 was replaced in 1962 by a revised model powered by a six-cylinder 2,433 cc engine. It was marketed as the Austin Freeway and was produced by BMC Australia until 1965.

A60 Cambridge

An upgraded Cambridge model, now called the A60, was introduced in October 1961. It included a new 1.6-litre version of the B-Series straight-four engine which had first been used in the MGA. Modified styling included side chrome stripes – some models with contrasting colour infills – and reduced fins on the rear wings. The style continued to be known as "Farina". This body covered a chassis that was slightly longer in wheelbase and wider in track than the A55. This allowed three people to be accommodated on the rear seat. Anti-roll bars were added to both front and rear suspension. An estate version with the petrol engine, called the Countryman, was also offered.The A60 from 1966 was offered with many optional extras including a more powerful dual carburetor version to keep up with increasing competition from the Continent and Japan.

A diesel version was introduced in 1961 for export cars and was available in the UK from 1962. Early manual models had the option of column gear change. The Borg Warner three-speed Type 35 automatic transmission was an option, the first British car to be fitted with this type, with the selector on the steering column. A 1.5-litre diesel option, mainly for the taxi trade, was introduced in November 1962.

The A60 Cambridge sold well, with 276,534 being built before production finally ended in 1969. Its intended successor, the front-wheel-drive Austin 1800 of 1964, did not affect sales, so Cambridge production was continued until 1969 at the Morris plant at Cowley when the Austin Maxi took over production line. The Morris Oxford version continued in production until 1971, when the Morris Marina was launched.

Austin A60 saloons assembled in Ireland by Brittain Smith of Portobello, Dublin 2 were identifiable by the use of Morris Oxford series VI tail-lights. The last of these were produced in 1970, and some were registered in 1971. The A60 Cambridge was effectively replaced by the Austin Maxi hatchback in April 1969, while the Oxford continued until early 1971, when it was replaced by the Morris Marina.

Both a manual and automatic version of the A60 were tested by The Motor magazine in 1961. The test car cost £883 including taxes of £278. The car cost £982 including taxes of £309.

References

External links

 Austin Memories—History of Austin and Longbridge
 Austin Cambridge / Westminster Car Club (ACWCC) – Classic car club for all owners and enthusiasts of this range of BMC cars. Dedicated to the A40, A55 and A60, Westminster, Morris Oxford, MG Magnette, and other Riley & Wolseley derivatives.
 Cambridge-Oxford Owners Club (COOC) – a worldwide owners club which caters for these cars and their Westminster-derived six-cylinder sisters. The club aims to keep the cars on the road, provides advice, spares and a social forum for enjoying the cars.

Cambridge
1960s cars
Compact executive cars
Rear-wheel-drive vehicles
Cars introduced in 1954
Sedans
Station wagons